Nuno Miguel Almeida Costa Lopes (born 19 December 1986) is a Portuguese professional footballer who plays as a right-back.

Club career
Born in Lisbon, Lopes spent until the age of 23 in lower league and amateur football. During that timeframe, he represented S.U. Sintrense, Lewes (English sixth division), CD Operário and Boavista FC.

Lopes made his professional debut in 2010–11, with U.D. Oliveirense, his first game in the competition occurring on 29 August 2010 as he played 68 minutes in a 1–0 home win against C.D. Fátima in the Segunda Liga. Late into the 2012 January transfer window he signed with Primeira Liga club S.C. Beira-Mar, contributing 19 matches in his first full season, which ended in relegation.

For the 2013–14 campaign, Lopes joined Rio Ave F.C. also in the top division on a two-year contract. During his tenure in Vila do Conde he played understudy to Brazilian Lionn and, in another winter transfer move, signed for Apollon Limassol FC of the Cypriot First Division.

Lopes then had brief spells with G.D. Estoril Praia – where he failed to appear in any matches due to a knee injury– and C.F. União. He returned to Cyprus on 2 August 2019, agreeing to a deal at Aris Limassol FC (Second Division).

Personal life
Lopes' twin brother, Miguel, was also a footballer and a right-back. Both came through exactly the same youth system setup, with the exception of S.L. Benfica.

Club statistics

References

External links

1986 births
Living people
Portuguese twins
Twin sportspeople
Portuguese footballers
Footballers from Lisbon
Association football defenders
Primeira Liga players
Liga Portugal 2 players
Segunda Divisão players
S.U. Sintrense players
CD Operário players
Boavista F.C. players
U.D. Oliveirense players
S.C. Beira-Mar players
Rio Ave F.C. players
G.D. Estoril Praia players
C.F. União players
National League (English football) players
Lewes F.C. players
Cypriot First Division players
Cypriot Second Division players
Apollon Limassol FC players
Aris Limassol FC players
Portuguese expatriate footballers
Expatriate footballers in England
Expatriate footballers in Cyprus
Portuguese expatriate sportspeople in England
Portuguese expatriate sportspeople in Cyprus